George West may refer to:

 George West, Texas, a city in Live Oak County, Texas, United States
 George Washington West, cattle rancher and namesake of George West, Texas
 George West (American politician) (1823–1901), industrialist and U.S. Representative from New York
 George West, Viscount Cantelupe (1814–1850), British politician
 George West (footballer), English footballer
 George West (bishop) (1893–1980), British Anglican missionary and bishop
 George Stephen West (1876–1919), British botanist
 George West (rugby league) (1880/81–1927), English rugby league footballer

West, George